Hymen, Hymenaios or Hymenaeus, in Hellenistic religion, is a god of marriage ceremonies, inspiring feasts and song. Related to the god's name, a hymenaios is a genre of Greek lyric poetry sung during the procession of the bride to the groom's house in which the god is addressed, in contrast to the Epithalamium, which is sung at the nuptial threshold. He is one of the winged love gods, the Erotes.

Hymen is the son of Apollo and one of the muses, Clio or Calliope or Urania or Terpsichore.

Etymology
Hymen's name is derived from the Proto-Indo-European root *syuh₁-men-, "to sew together," hence, "joiner;" it is also recorded in Doric Greek as Ῡ̔μᾱ́ν (Hyman). The term hymen was also used for a thin skin or membrane, such as the hymen that covers the vaginal opening and was traditionally supposed to be broken by sexual intercourse following a woman's (first) marriage. So, the membrane's name was not directly connected to that of the god, but they shared the same root and in folk etymology were sometimes supposed to be related.

Function and representation
Hymen is supposed to attend every wedding. If he did not, then the marriage would supposedly prove disastrous, so the Greeks would run about calling his name aloud. He presided over many of the weddings in Greek mythology, for all the deities and their children.

Hymen is celebrated in the ancient marriage song of unknown origin (called a Hymenaios) Hymen o Hymenae, Hymen delivered by G. Valerius Catullus.

Mythology
Hymen was mentioned in Euripides's The Trojan Women, where Cassandra says:

Hymen is also mentioned in Virgil's Aeneid and in seven plays by William Shakespeare: Hamlet, The Tempest, Much Ado about Nothing, Titus Andronicus, Pericles, Prince of Tyre, Timon of Athens and As You Like It, where he joins the couples at the end —

Hymen also appears in the work of the 7th- to 6th-century BCE Greek poet Sappho (translation: M. L. West, Greek Lyric Poetry, Oxford University Press):

Hymen is most commonly the son of Apollo and one of the Muses. In Seneca's play Medea, he is stated to be the son of Dionysus.

Other stories give Hymen a legendary origin. In one of the surviving fragments of the Megalai Ehoiai attributed to Hesiod, it's told that Magnes "had a son of remarkable beauty, Hymenaeus. And when Apollo saw the boy, he was seized with love for him, and wouldn't leave the house of Magnes".

Aristophanes' Peace ends with Trygaeus and the Chorus singing the wedding song, with the repeated phrase "Oh Hymen! Oh Hymenaeus!", a typical refrain for a wedding song.

Maurus Servius Honoratus, in his commentaries on Virgil's Eclogues, mentions that Hesperus, the Evening Star, inhabited Mount Oeta in Thessaly and that there he had loved the young Hymenaeus, son of Dionysus and Ariadne.

Later story of origin
According to a later romance, Hymen was an Athenian youth of great beauty but low birth who fell in love with the daughter of one of the city's wealthiest women. Since he couldn't speak to her or court her, due to his social standing, he instead followed her wherever she went.

Hymen disguised himself as a woman in order to join one of these processions, a religious rite at Eleusis where only women went. The assemblage was captured by pirates, Hymen included. He encouraged the women and plotted strategy with them, and together they killed their captors. He then agreed with the women to go back to Athens and win their freedom, if he were allowed to marry one of them. He thus succeeded in both the mission and the marriage, and his marriage was so happy that Athenians instituted festivals in his honour and he came to be associated with marriage.

According to Apollodorus, "the Orphics report" that Hymenaeus was among those resurrected by Asclepius.

In popular culture 
At least since the Italian Renaissance, Hymen was generally represented in art as a young man wearing a garland of flowers and holding a burning torch in one hand.

Hymen appears as a character in the final scene of William Shakespeare's pastoral comedy As You Like It, where he presides over four weddings joining eight characters, including the play's protagonist and heroine Rosalind with her beloved Orlando.

There is a song to Hymen in the comic opera H.M.S. Pinafore by W. S. Gilbert and A. Sullivan.

Hymen (1921) is an early book of poetry by the American modernist poet H.D. The eponymous long poem of the collection imagines an ancient Greek women's ritual for a bride.

Hymen is also mentioned in chapter 20 of Vanity Fair by William Makepeace Thackeray.

Hymen is mentioned by a wedding guest in an episode of Buffy the Vampire Slayer, “Hell’s Bells” (Season 6, Episode 16). The guest, a demon, wishes “Hymen’s greetings” to Buffy's younger sister, Dawn, and explains Hymen is the “god of matrimony”.

Sister project

Notes

References
 Apollodorus, Apollodorus, The Library, with an English Translation by Sir James George Frazer, F.B.A., F.R.S. in 2 Volumes. Cambridge, Massachusetts, Harvard University Press; London, William Heinemann Ltd. 1921. . Online version at the Perseus Digital Library.
 Catullus, Poem 62.
 Grimal, Pierre, The Dictionary of Classical Mythology, Wiley-Blackwell, 1996. .
 Schmitz, Leonhard, "HYMEN." In Smith, William, (ed.) Dictionary of Greek and Roman Biography and Mythology, London (1873). Online version at the Perseus Digital Library.
 Maas, P. "Hymenaios" REF 9 (1916) pp. 130–34.
 Ovid. Medea in Metamorphoses, 12.
 Virgil, Aeneid, Theodore C. Williams. trans. Boston. Houghton Mifflin Co. 1910. Online version at the Perseus Digital Library.

Music and singing gods
Greek love and lust deities
Marriage deities
Greek gods
Personifications in Greek mythology
Male lovers of Apollo
Children of Apollo
Children of Dionysus
Deities in the Aeneid
Ancient Greek wedding hymns
Erotes
LGBT themes in Greek mythology
Homosexuality and bisexuality deities